Antonín Plachý (born January 9, 1971) is a former Czech footballer who had stints in the Czech First League, USL A-League, and the Canadian Professional Soccer League.

Playing career 
Plachý began his career in 1995 with Czech giants AC Sparta Prague of the Czech First League, and played two seasons with Sparta Krc. On July 26, 2002 the Toronto Lynx of the USL A-League announced the signing of Plachý. He made his debut for the club on July 26, 2002 in a match against the Hampton Roads Mariners. At the conclusion of the USL A-League season, Plachý signed with Toronto Supra of the Canadian Professional Soccer League. He made his debut on September 6, 2002 in a match against York Region Shooters. He appeared in nine matches with Supra, but failed to reach the postseason by finishing last in the Eastern Conference.

References 

1971 births
Living people
Canadian Soccer League (1998–present) players
Czech footballers
Czech First League players
SC Toronto players
AC Sparta Prague players
Toronto Lynx players
A-League (1995–2004) players
SK Sparta Krč players
Association football defenders